University of Paris-Seine was an association of universities and higher education institutions (ComUE) located in the region of Paris, France. Member institutes include National School of Arts (Paris-Cergy), National School of Architecture (Versailles), National School of Landscaping, ESSEC Business School and University of Cergy-Pontoise among others. Started as the Paris-Seine initiative, it was renamed to University of Paris-Seine in 2015 according to the 2013 Law on Higher Education and Research (France).

History
The association original formed as one of the Pôle de recherche et d'enseignement supérieur (PRES) in France, organizing universities and research institutions from West of Île-de-France, covering nearly the whole spectrum of sciences (fundamental, engineering, business). As a PRES, the association was named "Université du grand ouest parisien" and was officially created the 6th of February 2012, in the form of a établissement public de coopération scientifique (EPCS).
It has been renamed « Université Paris-Seine » the 1st of March 2015.

Members

The members of the University of Paris-Seine as of the 2015 statute are:

 Cergy-Pontoise University - UCP ;
 CY Tech, formerly École internationale des sciences du traitement de l'information - EISTI ; 
 ESSEC Business School - ESSEC ;
 ISIPCA  (Institut supérieur international du parfum, de la cosmétique et de l'aromatique alimentaire) 
 École nationale supérieure d’architecture de Versailles - ENSA-V ;
 École nationale supérieure du paysage - ENSP-V ;
 École nationale supérieure d'arts de Paris-Cergy - ENSAPC ;
 École nationale supérieure de l'électronique et de ses applications (ENSEA) ;
 Supméca (Institut Supérieur de Mécanique) );
 École de Biologie Industrielle - EBI ;
 École d'électricité, de production et des méthodes industrielles - ECAM-EPMI ;
 Institut libre d'éducation physique supérieur - ILEPS ;
 École supérieure d'Informatique, réseaux et systèmes d'information - ITESCIA ;
 École pratique de service social - EPSS ;
 École d'ingénieur d'agro-développement international - ISTOM.

External links
 Université Paris-Seine - Official website

References

Education in Cergy-Pontoise
Engineering universities and colleges in France
Universities in Île-de-France
Schools of informatics
Educational institutions established in 2012
2012 establishments in France